Skelton-on-Ure or Skelton is a village and civil parish in the Harrogate district of North Yorkshire, England. There is one village pub called The Black Lion, a primary school, and one Village Store including a Post Office counter.

The main entrance to Newby Hall Estate is situated at the south end of the village. It was used as a location in Jane Austen's Mansfield Park (2007) broadcast by PBS in its Complete Jane Austen series.

North-east of the village is Skelton Windmill, a Georgian windmill that was owned by the Newby Hall estate. Completed in 1822, the grade II listed building was used to grind corn and other cereals and is the best example of such a windmill left in North Yorkshire.

Notable residents

 Frederick John Robinson (The Viscount Goderich), Prime Minister of the United Kingdom, 1827–28, was born in Newby Hall
 George Dawson (1821–1889), self-made man and property developer.

References

External links

Villages in North Yorkshire
Civil parishes in North Yorkshire